Senator Knowles may refer to:

Jesse Monroe Knowles (1919–2006), Louisiana State Senate
Robert P. Knowles (1916–1985), Wisconsin State Senate
Warren P. Knowles (1908–1993), Wisconsin State Senate